Retshegofaditswe 'Tshego' Nché – more commonly referred to as Ox Nché – (born 23 July 1995) is a South African rugby union player for the  in Super Rugby and the South African national team the Springboks. His regular position is prop, and he is one of the world’s most revered scrummagers.

Club rugby

Youth (2011–14)

Nché first earned provincial selection in 2011, when he was included in the Free State squad that participated at the Under-16 Grant Khomo Week in Queenstown.

In 2012, Nché represented Free State at the premier high school rugby union competition in South Africa – the Under-18 Craven Week competition – held in Port Elizabeth, starting all three of Free State's matches, despite still being in the Under-17 age-group. After the tournament, he was selected in a South African Schools squad that played against France, Wales and England. He was an unused substitute in the first two matches, but started the match against England.

Nché once again played in all three of Free State's matches at the 2013 Under-18 Craven Week competition held in Polokwane, scoring a try in their opening match against Eastern Province. He was once again included in the South African Schools side in 2013, this time starting two matches against England and Wales. He also made three appearances for the s during the 2013 Under-19 Provincial Championship.

Nché was a key player for the  team in the 2014 Under-19 Provincial Championship, starting all thirteen of their matches in the competition as his side finished second on the log before losing 22–29 to eventual champions  in the semi-finals.

Varsity Cup 

In 2015, Nché was named in the  squad for the 2015 Varsity Cup competition. He started the competition as a reserve, playing off the bench on five occasions before being named in the starting line-up for the first time in their final regular season match against . He retained his starting spot for their 21–10 victory over defending champions  in the semi-final and also started the final, helping UFS Shimlas to a 63–33 victory against NWU Pukke to win the competition for the first time in their history.

International 
Nché was named in a 37-man South Africa Under-20 training squad and played for them in a 31–24 victory in a friendly match against a Varsity Cup Dream Team that was named at the conclusion of the 2015 Varsity Cup competition. He was then named in their squad to tour Argentina for a two-match series as preparation for the 2015 World Rugby Under 20 Championship. He started their 25–22 victory over Argentina in the first match, but did not feature in their 39–28 win in the second match four days later.

Upon the team's return, Nché was named in the final squad for the 2015 World Rugby Under 20 Championship. He started all three of their matches in Pool B of the competition; a 33–5 win against hosts Italy, a 40–8 win against Samoa and a 46–13 win over Australia. Nché scored one of six tries in their match against Australia to help South Africa finish top of Pool B to qualify for the semi-finals with the best record pool stage of all the teams in the competition. Nché started their semi-final match against England, but could not prevent them losing 20–28 to be eliminated from the competition by England for the second year in succession. He started their third-place play-off match against France, helping South Africa to a 31–18 win to win the bronze medal.

References

External links
 

South African rugby union players
Living people
1995 births
Rugby union players from Bloemfontein
Rugby union props
Free State Cheetahs players
South Africa Under-20 international rugby union players
South Africa international rugby union players
Cheetahs (rugby union) players
Sharks (rugby union) players
Sharks (Currie Cup) players